Vatre ivanjske (Midsummer Fires) is a Croatian telenovela produced by RTL Televizija. It is an original story, produced in 2014, and starring Nevena Ristić, Slaven Španović and Ksenija Pajić.

Cast

References

External links

Croatian television series
2010s Croatian television series
2014 Croatian television series debuts
Nova TV (Croatia) original programming